Cowboy Christmas: Cowboy Songs II is the seventeenth album by American singer-songwriter Michael Martin Murphey, his second album of cowboy songs, and his first album of Christmas music.

Track listing
 "I Heard The Bells On Christmas" / "Old Time Christmas" (Caskin, Kiskaddon, Longfellow) – 2:24
 "Jolly Old St. Nicholas" / "The Christmas Letter" (Mitchell) – 2:39
 "The Creak of the Leather" (Kiskaddon) – 0:26
 "Christmas on the Line (The Line Rider's Christmas)" (Murphey, Raines) – 3:08
 "Sleigh Ride" / "Jingle Bells" (Anderson, Parish, Pierpont) – 2:39
 "The Christmas Trail" (Clark, Edwards) – 3:13
 "Merry Texas Christmas You All" (Harris, Miller) – 2:11
 "Ridin' Home On Christmas Eve" (Green) – 2:46
 "Corn, Water and Wood" (Elliott, Waldman) – 3:10
 "The Cowboy Christmas Ball" (Chittenden) – 3:35
 Polka Medley: "Good King Wenceslas" / "Under The Double Eagle" / "Redwing" / "Golden Slippers" – 1:48
 "Christmas Cowboy Style" (Murphey, Quist) – 3:11
 "Santa Claus Shottische" – 1:23
 "Two-Step `Round The Christmas Tree" (Bogguss, Crider) – 2:33
 Two Step Medley: "Cotton-Eyed Joe" / "Deck the Halls" / "Buffalo Gals" / "Soldier's Joy" / "The Girl I Left Behind" / "Deck the Halls" – 1:58
 "Log Cabin Home in the Sky" (Heron) – 2:39
 Waltz Medley: "O Christmas Tree (O Tannenbaum)" / "Put Your Little Foot (The Varsouvianna)" / "The Westfalia Waltz" / "Over the Waves (The Skaters' Waltz)" / "O Christmas Tree" – 2:30
 "Pearls in the Snow" (Murphey, Quist, Dunn) – 3:08
 "Good Night Ladies" / "Auld Lang Syne" – 1:17

Credits
Music
 Michael Martin Murphey – vocals, arranger, producer, liner notes
 Debra Black – arranger, conductor
 Waddie Mitchell – speaking parts
 Suzy Bogguss - vocals (Two-Step 'Round The Christmas Tree)
 Riders in the Sky – vocals
 Don Edwards – arranger
 Steve Gibson – electric guitar, acoustic guitar, gut string guitar, mandolin, background vocals, producer, arranger
 Randy Scruggs – acoustic guitar
 Bruce Bouton – pedal steel
 Sonny Garrish – pedal steel
 David Schnaufer – hammer dulcimer
 Alisa Jones – hammer dulcimer
 Sam Bush – fiddle, mandolin, mandola
 Carl Jackson – banjo
 Vince Farsetta – claw hammer banjo
 Dennis Burnside – piano
 Phil Naish – synthesizer
 Joey Miskulin – accordion, arranger
 David Hungate – electric bass
 Craig Hungate – acoustic bass
 Craig Nelson – acoustic bass
 Lonnie Wilson – percussion, drums
 The Kid Connection – background vocals
 Emily Estes – background vocals
 Lori Casteel – background vocals
 Dionne McGuire – background vocals
 Gary Janney – background vocals
 Carrie Gardner – background vocals
 Bethany Wright – background vocals
 Tommy Gardner – background vocals
 Curtis Young – background vocals
 Rachel Howell – background vocals
 Dennis Wilson – background vocals

Production
 Carol Elliott – production coordination
 Eric Prestidge – engineer
 Keith Compton – engineer
 Patrick Kelly – assistant engineer
 Marshall Morgan – mixing
 Denny Purcell – mastering
 Steven Whatley – cover design, design
 William Matthews – watercolor artwork

References

External links
 Michael Martin Murphey's Official Website

1991 Christmas albums
Christmas albums by American artists
Michael Martin Murphey albums
Warner Records albums
Country Christmas albums
Sequel albums